The 1954 St. Louis Cardinals season was the team's 73rd season in St. Louis, Missouri and its 63rd season in the National League. The Cardinals went 72–82 during the season and finished 6th in the National League.

Offseason 
 December 1, 1953: 1953 minor league draft
Brooks Lawrence was drafted by the Cardinals from the Cincinnati Reds.
 December 1, 1953: Sonny Senerchia was drafted by the Cardinals from the Pittsburgh Pirates.
 January 26, 1954: Dick Sisler, Eddie Erautt and $100,000 were traded by the Cardinals to the San Diego Padres for Tom Alston.

Regular season 
In his first four major league games, first baseman Joe Cunningham became the first Cardinals player to hit at least two home runs.  On April 6, 2016, Jeremy Hazelbaker matched him for this feat.

Outfielder Wally Moon won the Rookie of the Year Award this year, batting .304, with 12 home runs and 76 RBIs. Along the way, on April 13 Moon hit a home run in his first major league at-bat.

During the season, Tom Alston became the first black player in the history of the Cardinals.

Season standings

Record vs. opponents

Notable transactions 
 April 11, 1954: Enos Slaughter was traded by the Cardinals to the New York Yankees for Bill Virdon, Mel Wright, and Emil Tellinger (minors).
 April 30, 1954: Steve Bilko was purchased from the Cardinals by the Chicago Cubs for $12,500.

Roster

Player stats

Batting

Starters by position 
Note: Pos = Position; G = Games played; AB = At bats; H = Hits; Avg. = Batting average; HR = Home runs; RBI = Runs batted in

Other batters 
Note: G = Games played; AB = At bats; H = Hits; Avg. = Batting average; HR = Home runs; RBI = Runs batted in

Pitching

Starting pitchers 
Note: G = Games pitched; IP = Innings pitched; W = Wins; L = Losses; ERA = Earned run average; SO = Strikeouts

Other pitchers 
Note: G = Games pitched; IP = Innings pitched; W = Wins; L = Losses; ERA = Earned run average; SO = Strikeouts

Relief pitchers 
Note: G = Games pitched; W = Wins; L = Losses; SV = Saves; ERA = Earned run average; SO = Strikeouts

Farm system 

LEAGUE CHAMPIONS: Houston

References

External links 
1954 St. Louis Cardinals at Baseball Reference
1954 St. Louis Cardinals team page at www.baseball-almanac.com

St. Louis Cardinals seasons
Saint Louis Cardinals season
1954 in sports in Missouri